Alessandra Panaro (14 December 1939 – 1 May 2019) was an Italian film actress of the late 1950s and early 1960s.

Panaro is best known for her films in the early 1960s, notably Luchino Visconti's crime drama Rocco e i suoi fratelli in 1960.

Life and career
Born in Rome into a wealthy family, Panaro studied acting under Teresa Franchini. She made her film debut at 16 years old, and got a large success in 1956 thanks to the Dino Risi's comedy film Poor, But Handsome, then specializing in romantic comedies. In 1957–8, together with her Poor, But Handsome co-star Lorella De Luca, she assisted Mario Riva in presenting the popular RAI game show Il Musichiere.

Personal life
Panaro was first married to the Italian-Egyptian banker Jean-Pierre Sabet. Widowed, in 1992 she married the actor Giancarlo Sbragia.

She died on 1 May 2019 in her home in Geneva at the age of 79.

Partial filmography

 The Boatman of Amalfi (1954)
 Destinazione Piovarolo (1955)
 Il campanile d'oro (1955)
 Wild Love (1956) – Marcella
 Guardia, guardia scelta, brigadiere e maresciallo (1956) – Charlotte
 I miliardari (1956) – Mariuccia
 Mamma sconosciuta (1956) – Lia
 Cantando sotto le stelle (1956) – Lucia Traversa
 Poveri ma belli (1957) – Anna Maria
 Lazzarella (1957) – Sandra Carpella
 Belle ma povere (1957) – Anna Maria
 Lazzarella (1957) – Sandra Carpella
 Pretty But Poor (1957) – Anna Maria
 La trovatella di Pompei (1957) – Maria Molinaro / Curti
 Love and Chatter (1958) – Doddy Paseroni
 Si le roi savait ça (1958) – Mireille
 Toto, Peppino and the Fanatics (1958) – Vignanelli's Daughter
 Te doy mi vida (1958)
 L'ultima canzone (1958)
 Cigarettes, Whiskey and Wild Women (1959)
 I ragazzi dei Parioli (1959) – Susy
 Avventura a Capri (1959) – Sandra
 Poveri milionari (1959) – Annamaria
 Le notti dei Teddy Boys (1959) – Luisa
 Il raccomandato di ferro (1959) – Wilma
 Cerasella (1959) – Nora
 Rocco and His Brothers (1960)  – Ciro's fiancée
 The Bacchantes (1961) – Manto
 Pecado de amor (1961) – Esperanza
 Mariti a congresso (1961)
 Ulysses Against the Son of Hercules (1962) – Elena
 The Son of Captain Blood (1962) – Abigail 'Abby' McBride
 The Secret Mark of D'Artagnan (1962) – Diana
 The Executioner of Venice (1963) – Leonora Danin
 Hercules vs. Moloch (1964) – Medea, Queen of Tyro
 Temple of the White Elephant (1964) – Cynthia Montague
 The Shoot (1964) – Frau des Schut (uncredited)
 The Treasure of the Aztecs (1965) – Rosita Arbellez
The Pyramid of the Sun God (1965)  – Rosita Arbellez
 30 Winchester per El Diablo (1965) – Pamela Webb
 La notte dell'addio (1966)
 Sexycop (1976)
 La notte è piccola per noi (2016) – Adelina (final film role)

References

External links and sources
 

1939 births
2019 deaths
Italian film actresses
Actresses from Rome
20th-century Italian actresses